Christian Larsen (born 12 September 1947) is a Danish boxer. He competed in the men's light middleweight event at the 1968 Summer Olympics.

References

1947 births
Living people
Danish male boxers
Olympic boxers of Denmark
Boxers at the 1968 Summer Olympics
Sportspeople from Aalborg
Light-middleweight boxers